Gekko albofasciolatus is a species of gecko. It is endemic to the Indo-Australian archipelago. It is sometimes considered conspecific with Gekko smithii.

References

Gekko
Reptiles described in 1867
Taxa named by Albert Günther